Neeltje Adriana (Ella) Kalsbeek (born 5 January 1955 in Middelburg) is a former Dutch politician. She was a member of House of Representatives of the Netherlands for the Labour Party (Partij van de Arbeid, 1989–2001, 2002–2006). She was State Secretary of Justice under Wim Kok (2001–2001). Since 1 March 2007 she is president of the board of directors of Altra College, an institute for youth care and special education in Amsterdam.

References 
  Parlement.com biography

1955 births
Living people
Dutch women in politics
Dutch women jurists
Erasmus University Rotterdam alumni
Labour Party (Netherlands) politicians
Members of the House of Representatives (Netherlands)
People from Middelburg, Zeeland
State Secretaries for Justice of the Netherlands